Stanway may refer to:

Places
Stanway, Essex
Stanway, Gloucestershire

People
 Georgia Stanway (b. 1999), English association football player
 Mark Stanway (b. 1954), a British musician
 Peter Powers (real name Peter Stanway), a British television personality who purports to be a hypnotist

Other
 Stanway House, a Jacobean manor house near Stanway, Gloucestershire
 Stanway Rovers F.C., a football club based in Stanway, Essex